Norma Patricia Saucedo Moreno (born 9 February 1972) is a Mexican politician affiliated with the National Action Party. As of 2014 she served as Deputy of the LIX Legislature of the Mexican Congress representing Nuevo León.

References

1972 births
Living people
Politicians from Monterrey
Women members of the Chamber of Deputies (Mexico)
National Action Party (Mexico) politicians
Deputies of the LIX Legislature of Mexico
Members of the Chamber of Deputies (Mexico) for Nuevo León